Dangti is the oldest village in this location. In Dangti Pokhariya community lives.  Dungra, Chausal, and Dokuna are also in the Garkha region. 

Garkha is the Himalayan fertile and lush green mountain country in front of Askot region of Uttarakhand state of India in the Pithoragarh district . This region tilted from South West to North East. Literally in Kumauni it means the herds of cows. Well linked with roads with Ogla at its entry point. This place lies in the Kanalichhina development block of Didihat tehsil and sub division. This area is lies on the mountain on the northern slopes of western Himalayas.This place is full of Rhododendron, Quercus, Myrica and Pinus forests. In this place many villages lies between Dhanlek peak and Bagarihat and the plains of Titari on the left bank of river Kali on one at lower side. Once ruled by Rajbar of Askot and this place was long under the Gorkha Kings of Nepal. This area was the main area of commerce with river trade point at once flourshing trade city of Bagdihat, on the banks of river Kali.The main villages of the region are Ogla, Singli, Jethigaun, Mailmuna, Sunakot, Digara, Udma, Barakot, Majhera, Agaon, Pantgaon, Naret, Ojhagaon, Bhulkhet, Bhagichaura-Town of Garkha (in Dangti Gram Sabha), Dangti, Dungara, Dokuna, Pasma, Bagadihat, Titari and Chausala.This region is scenically majestic with the view of Panchchuli, Chhiplakot and Annapurna peaks of Himalaya.

Villages in Pithoragarh district